AZ is a French record label established in 2002 as an affiliate of  Universal with a big list of artists signed or with distribution rights for their releases in France.

Valéry Zeitoun
The founder and first president of AZ record label, Valéry Zeitoun, was born in Pantin near Paris on 13 February 1966. He ran the label from its creation in 2002 until October 2011.

The label also encourages many new artists. Valéry Zeitoun (already a judge in the French television reality series Popstars in its second season in 2002) famously ran a campaign in 2010 on Facebook entitled Je veux signer chez AZ (meaning I want to sign with AZ). Two candidates were selected to join the label, namely Victor Le Douarec and Mélissa Nkonda. The campaign was so popular, Zeitoun ran a second series of casting for talent in 2011 resulting in signing of a third new artist, namely Alias Hilsum.

Valéry Zeitoun also appeared in film Backstage directed by Emmanuelle Bercot where he plays the role of manager of the singer Lauren Marks (played by Emmanuelle Seigner).

He continued to run the label until October 2011, but resigned from Universal Music France and AZ to consecrate himself to other projects.

Julien Creuzard
Zeitoun was replaced in November 2011 by Julien Creuzard This was confirmed by Pascal Nègre in a communique. Nègre also wants the label to be more involved in development of young artists, whereas more established AZ artists will change label and be more integrated in other labels like Mercury.

Creuzard had joined Universal Music France in 2007, and was until his new assignment head of another affiliate, Universal Music Publishing. Musique Info says he had been instrumental in signing  Yodelice, Féfé, Inna and Tom Frager. He also has experience running an independent production house.

Artists 
A complete list of artists (as of July 2010):

 Admiral T
 Alias Hilsum
 Absynthe Minded
 Amy Winehouse
 Benjamin Paulin
 Booba
 Catherine Lara
 Carmen Maria Vega
 Chimène
 Christophe
 Cheryl Cole
 Coco Sumner
 Creature
 Cyril Mokaiesh
 Dani
 Dan Black
 Davide Esposito
 Duffy
 Ellie Goulding
 Fally Ipupa
 Florent Pagny
 Florence and the Machine
 Gabriella Cilmi
 Gérard Darmon
 Gérard Palaprat
 Grand Corps Malade
 IAM
 Izia
 James Morrison
 John Mamann
 Julia Migenes
 Juliette Katz
 Kate Nash
 Keane
 Kool Shen
 Koxie
 Laszlo Jones
 Le comte de Bouderbala
 Les Chanteuses
 Michel Delpech
 Mélissa Nkonda
 Mokaiesh
 Okou
 Pascale Picard
 Paul Weller
 Pep's
 Professeur Love
 Queen
 Régine
 Saint André
 Salif
 Sara Schiralli
 Scissor Sisters
 Snow Patrol
 Souad Massi
 Starliners
 Sugababes
 Take That
 The Rolling Stones
 The Wanted
 Tom Frager
 Toma
 U2
 Victor Le Douarec
 VV Brown
 Yas
 Yeah Yeah Yeahs

References

External links
Valéry Zeitoun Blog

French record labels